Juan Carlos Blanco Fernández (15 September 1847 – 13 January 1910) was a Uruguayan political figure and education advocate.

Background

He was closely identified with the Colorado and Constitutional Parties.

He married Luisa Acevedo Vásquez, daughter of the prominent jurist Eduardo Acevedo Maturana. His son Daniel Blanco Acevedo was to become a Deputy for Montevideo. His son Juan Carlos Blanco Acevedo was himself to become Foreign Minister of Uruguay. His grandson Juan Carlos Blanco Estradé was also to become Foreign Minister of Uruguay.

Political offices

He was Foreign Minister of Uruguay in 1886. He served as the President of the Senate of Uruguay from 1901 to 1902.

He had been elected to serve as Deputy for Montevideo in 1873.

Other notable activities

He was identified with the cause of education reform in Uruguay and was a close associate of Pedro Varela and others in this field.

He was President of the Bank of the Republic 1907–1910.

Death

He died in 1910.

See also

 Politics of Uruguay
 List of political families

References

1847 births
1910 deaths
Presidents of the Senate of Uruguay
Foreign ministers of Uruguay
Colorado Party (Uruguay) politicians
Members of the Chamber of Representatives of Uruguay
19th-century Paraguayan people
Constitutional Party (Uruguay) politicians